Universal evolution is a theory of evolution formulated by Pierre Teilhard de Chardin and Julian Huxley that describes the gradual development of the Universe from subatomic particles to human society, considered by Teilhard as the last stage.

Vernadsky's and Teilhard's theories
Vladimir Ivanovich Vernadsky influenced Pierre Teilhard de Chardin, and the two formulated very similar theories describing the gradual development of the universe from subatomic particles to human society and beyond.  Teilhard's theories are better known in the West (and have also been commented on by Julian Huxley), and integrate Darwinian evolution and Christianity,  whilst Vernadsky wrote more purely from a scientific perspective.

Three classic levels are described.  Cosmogenesis (Teilhard) or the formation of inanimate matter (the Physiosphere of Wilber), culminating in the Lithosphere, Atmosphere, Hydrosphere, etc. (Teilhard), or collectively, the Geosphere (Vernadsky).  Here progress is ruled by structure and mechanical laws, and matter is primarily of the nature of non-consciousness (Teilhard - the "Without").

This is followed by Biogenesis (Teilhard) and the origin of life or the  Biosphere (Vernadsky, Teilhard), where there is a greater degree of complexity and consciousness (Teilhard - the "Within"), ecology (Vernadsky) comes into play, and progress and development is the result of Darwinian mechanisms of evolution.

Finally there is human evolution and the rise of thought or cognition (Vernadsky, Teilhard),  and a further leap in complexity and the interior life  or consciousness (Teilhard), resulting in the birth of the Noosphere (Vernadsky, Teilhard).  Just as the biosphere transformed the geosphere, so the noosphere (human intervention) transformed the biosphere (Vernadsky).  Here the evolution of human society (socialization) is ruled by psychological, economic, informational and communicative processes.

For Teilhard there is a further stage, one of spiritual evolution, the Christing of the collective noosphere, in which humanity converges in a single divinisation he calls the Omega Point.

Evolutionary stages

Nine levels are described , the "classical" biological stages being levels 6, 7 & 8 of the universal evolution. Stages 1 to 5 are grouped into the Lithosphere, also called Geosphere or Physiosphere, where (the progress of) the structure of the organisms is ruled by structure, mechanical laws and coincidence. Stages 6 to 8 are grouped into the Biosphere, where (the progress of) the structure of the organisms is ruled by genetical mechanisms. The actual stage, stage 9, is called the Noosphere, where (the progress of) the structure of human society (socialization) is ruled by psychological, informational and communicative processes.

References 

 Paul R. Samson and David Pitt (eds.)(1999), The Biosphere and Noosphere Reader: Global Environment, Society and Change. 
 "The Quest for a Unified Theory of Information", Psychology Press, 1999
 Raymond, Eric (2000), "Homesteading the Noosphere", available online.
 Norgaard, R. B. (1994). Development betrayed: the end of progress and a coevolutionary revisioning of the future. London; New York, Routledge.

See also 
 Universal Darwinism
 Gaia theory
 Noosphere
 Spiritual evolution
 Involution (esoterism)
 Metaphysical cosmology
 Moore's law

Spiritual evolution